Wanaku (Quechua for guanaco, Hispanicized spelling Huanaco, Huanacu) is a mountain in the Andes of Bolivia, about  high. It is situated in the Potosí Department, Nor Lípez Province, Quemes Municipality, Pelcoya Canton. Wanaku lies southeast of the Ollagüe (Ullawi) volcano and northeast of Ch'aska Urqu.

References 

Mountains of Potosí Department